"Beauty on the Fire" is the third and final single from Australian singer-songwriter Natalie Imbruglia's second studio album, White Lilies Island (2001). The single charted at  26 in the United Kingdom, No. 27 in Italy, and No. 78 in Australia. The single re-entered the charts in 2008 after it was used in an episode of BBC One's Holby City.

Track listings
Australian CD single
 "Beauty on the Fire" (radio mix) – 3:54
 "Broken Thread" – 3:52
 "Standing There" – 3:56
 "Cold Air" – 5:00
 "Beauty on the Fire" (enhanced video) – 3:54

UK CD1
 "Beauty on the Fire" (radio mix) – 3:54
 "Beauty on the Fire" (Junkie XL mix) – 10:42
 "Broken Thread" – 3:52

UK CD2
 "Beauty on the Fire" (album version) – 4:22
 "Cold Air" – 5:00
 "Standing There" – 3:56
 "Beauty on the Fire" (enhanced video)

European CD single
 "Beauty on the Fire" (radio mix) – 3:54
 "Beauty on the Fire" (Junkie XL mix) – 10:42

Credits and personnel
Credits are lifted from the White Lilies Island album booklet.

Studios
 Recorded at Studio Milk and Crashpad (London, England)
 Mixed at Strongroom (London, England)
 Mastered at 360 Mastering (London, England)

Personnel

 Natalie Imbruglia – writing
 Gary Clark – writing, guitars, production
 Matthew Wilder – writing
 Hannah Robinson – backing vocals
 Paul Statham – guitars, programming
 Neil Taylor – guitars
 Marc Fox – percussion
 James Banbury – programming
 Pascal Gabriel – production, mixing
 Tom Elmhirst – mixing
 Myles Clarke – mixing assistance
 Andrej Bako – assistant engineering
 Dick Beetham – mastering

Charts

Release history

References

Natalie Imbruglia songs
2002 singles
2001 songs
Bertelsmann Music Group singles
Music videos directed by Mike Lipscombe
RCA Records singles
Songs written by Gary Clark (musician)
Songs written by Natalie Imbruglia